Jorquera is a municipality in the province of Albacete, Castile-La Mancha, Spain. It has a population of 529.

It is located on a spur sided by the Júcar river. The upper side of the hill is sided by 12th century walls built by the Almohads.

References

Municipalities of the Province of Albacete